Franzia is a brand of wine produced by The Wine Group, known for its box wines sold in 3 and 5-liter cartons. Franzia wines, throughout their history, were known as affordable table wines, popular in the 1960s and 1970s as "jug wine", and now as "box wine". The Wine Group is the third largest wine company in the world, behind Constellation Brands and the E&J Gallo Winery.  The Franzia brand today has no business relationship with Fred Franzia of the Bronco Wine Company, known for its low-cost Charles Shaw wines.  The Franzia family sold the brand to Coca-Cola in 1973 when Fred Franzia was in his early adult years; and it was sold to The Wine Group in 1981.

Teresa Franzia (born Teresa Carrara, 1879–1949) founded the Franzia Wine Company in 1906. Teresa's daughter, Amelia Franzia Gallo, was the wife of winemaker Ernest Gallo.  Teresa loaned Ernest the money to start his company.

History
The brand was originally named  after the Franzia family, who began growing grapes in California in 1892 and making wine in 1933 after the repeal of prohibition, later operating as the Franzia Brothers Winery, a Central Valley winery in Ripon, California.
In 1973, Coca-Cola agreed to acquire the Franzia Brothers Winery for stock valued at about $49.3 million. As part of the acquisition, the Franzias were prohibited from using their name in future winemaking businesses - The Franzia Brand, prominent on the boxed wines, is today unconnected to the family, who have subsequently opened a business called the Bronco Wine Company. In 1981, 
the Coca-Cola Company agreed to sell the wine business of the Coca-Cola Bottling Company of New York (which included the Franzia Brothers Winery alongside the Mogen David Wine Corporation and Tribuno Wines Inc.), in a management buyout involving the top-level managers of the bottler's wine business and the First Boston Corporation.

Vineyard
Franzia is produced by The Wine Group, which is based at Concannon Vineyard in San Francisco's East Bay, but operates 13 wineries in California, New York and Australia.

Wines

Red Wines
 Bold and Jammy Cab
 Burgundy
 Cabernet Sauvignon
 Chianti
 Chillable Red
 Dark Red Blend
 Fruity Red Sangria
 Merlot
 Pinot Noir/Carmenere

White Wines
 Chablis
 Chardonnay
 Crisp White
 Moscato
 Pinot Grigio/Colombard
 Refreshing White
 Rich & Buttery
 Sauvignon Blanc

Blush Wines
 Pink Moscato
 Rosé
 Sunset Blush
 White Merlot
 White Zinfandel

In popular culture

Oregon State University students organize the tour de franzia, a costumed bike parade inspired by the brand's namesake. The parade attracts students, local residents, and out-of-towners and occurs every term.
  Similarly, students at Wesleyan University organize an unofficial campus scavenger hunt involving boxed wine.

See also
 Bronco Wine Company

References

External links
 

Wine brands
American wine